Christians for Socialism (CPS) is a worldwide political and cultural movement focused on social inequality and economic injustice, inspired by liberation theology. It was founded in 1971.

Founding
Having begun in April 1971, Christians for Socialism first gained notoriety when a collection of eighty Chilean priests, known as the "Group of 80", publicly declared their support of the construction of socialism along the lines being followed by then-President Salvador Allende. The Secretariat of Christians for Socialism was formally established in September 1973. The group was predominantly composed of Roman Catholic members of the Christian left who were inspired and spurred on by the Second Vatican Council.

Project
CPS was founded to counteract a presumption that Christian institutions were inherently opposed to socialism. While its founders found aspects of socialist programs that they wished to critique, they wanted to do so as insiders within the socialist movement, rather than as adversaries. From their beginnings as supporters of Allende, CPS has been associated with firm support for socialist leaders. Accordingly, CPS leaders cultivated strong ties with Cuban Marxist politician Fidel Castro. It was intended as a movement of active political involvement and participation, and involved discussions bringing together current political events and church documents in light of each other. CPS inspired a series of social programs in the public sector. Priests in CPS led union units and organized peasant federations.

Antecedents

In Chile the immediate antecedent to CPS was the  movement. In Italy, many of the young people who had been involved in the Italian student and worker protests of 1968 joined the movement, and the Christian Associations of Italian Workers (ACLI) was very supportive.

Leaders
López Trujillo considers  a major leader of CPS. Another prominent leader was the Salesian priest Lidia Menapace, who was also a significant figure in the Italian Catholic resistance during World War II. In Spain, Alfonso Carlos Comín was a key leader in establishing the movement. The theologian Gustavo Gutiérrez was also a member and led sessions at all the major conferences.

Suppression
CPS faced opposition from the start. Left-leaning priests from Brazil and Bolivia were supportive but unable to participate in gatherings due to severe police control. CPS was short-lived in Chile, due to strong resistance from the Episcopal Conference of Chile under the direction of its secretary general, bishop Carlos Oviedo Cavada. In their letter condemning the movement, the bishops there argued that while the church speaks to "politics insofar as it underlies every social reality", it should not be involved in "partisan activity". Chilean clergy involved in the movement were banned from political participation altogether in April 1973. The movement was suppressed by the Chilean military government after the coup of 1973. Father , one of the most active members of CPS, left Chile at this time.

Gatherings
A number of important gatherings have been held under the auspices of Christians for Socialism. In 1972, 400 members met for a week at a textile union hall, urging "class struggle [as] the only valid course to necessary social change in Latin America." CPS brought together similar Latin American movements in the Latin American Meeting of Christians for Socialism 1974 in Santiago, Chile.

In 1975, the Christians for Socialism conference in Detroit, Michigan, formally introduced liberation theology to the United States. This event was a significant convergence where black, feminist, and third-world anti-imperialist movements joined together and recognized each other as peers in the same process of liberation, while also strongly critiquing one another. A detailed account of the meeting was published.

Christians for Socialism groups sprung up in France, Italy, and West Germany. In Germany, CPS was a radical rival to Enlightenment liberalism and "German idealism's aspirations to freedom".

Critiques
López Trujillo has critiqued CPS for holding an understanding of liberation too strongly influenced by Marxist political theory rather than the integral Christian liberation stance espoused by the Latin American Episcopal Conference. It has been said that for some members of Christians for Socialism, there is "no salvation incarnate outside of class struggle."

See also

 Christian democracy
 Catholic social teaching
 Christian socialism
 Socialism with a human face

References

Notes

Bibliography

Further reading

 
 Encuentro Latinoamericano de Cristianos por el Socialismo, Latin American Working Group (Toronto, Ont.), & Student Christian Movement of Canada. (1972). First Latin American Encounter of Christians for Socialism. Toronto: Latin American Working Group and the Student Christian Movement of Canada.

Catholic theology and doctrine
Liberation theology
World Christianity